Malcolm Storry (born 13 January 1948) is an English actor with extensive experience on stage, television, and film. Amongst many roles, he is perhaps best known for 'Yellin' in The Princess Bride,  HM Customs Chief Bill Adams on The Knock, and Clive Tishell in Doc Martin.

Storry was born in Hull, East Riding of Yorkshire. He has had an extensive career in theatre, TV, and film, including such roles as Sir Francis Drake in Elizabeth: The Golden Age, Bottom in A Midsummer Night's Dream for the National Theatre, and many roles for the Royal Shakespeare Company including Prospero and Caliban in The Tempest and Macduff and Banquo in Macbeth.

Selected filmography

References

External links

Living people
20th-century British male actors
1948 births
21st-century British male actors